13 Reasons Why is an American teen drama television series developed for Netflix by Brian Yorkey, based on the 2007 novel Thirteen Reasons Why by Jay Asher.

Series overview

Episodes

Season 1 (2017)

Season 2 (2018)

Season 3 (2019)

Season 4 (2020)

References

External links

Lists of American teen drama television series episodes